Samantha Castillo (born March 12, 1980 in Miranda, Venezuela) is a Venezuelan actress born in a small village near the capital Caracas. She has a degree in Performing Arts, graduated from the Central University of Venezuela and has been trained in different acting techniques, she also studied at the International Academy of Film and Television.
She has been acting since she was 15. She has appeared in several stage productions and became popular with the film Pelo Malo, a film by Mariana Rondon, winner of "Golden Shell (La Concha de Oro)" at the San Sebastián International Film Festival.
She also won the prize as best actress at Torino Film Festival 2013 where the jury president was Paolo Virzi.
The Venezuelan Film Academy recognized her as the best leading actress in 2018.

Filmography

 2013 - Pelo Malo (Bad Hair) directed by Mariana Rondon
 2015 - Le Badanti (The Caretakes) by Marco Pollini
 2015 - "El malquerido" (Dear Bad) directed by Diego Rísquez
 2017 - "El Amparo" directed by Rober Calzadilla

References

20th-century Venezuelan actresses
Living people
1980 births
21st-century Venezuelan actresses
Actresses from Caracas
Venezuelan stage actresses
Venezuelan film actresses